Zhou Pingjian is the Chinese ambassador to Nigeria. Zhou was confirmed in 2016.

References 

Living people
Year of birth missing (living people)